Bawit ( Bāwīṭ; Coptic: ⲡⲁⲩⲏⲧ Bawet) is an archaeological site located  north of Asyut, near the village of Dashlout, in Egypt. The structures on this site are relatively well preserved, and demonstrate different aspects of a monastic complex of Middle Egypt.

History
The Apa Apolla monastery (Coptic: ⲧⲟⲡⲟⲥ ⲛⲁⲡⲁ ⲁⲡⲟⲗⲗⲱ) is a Coptic monastery founded c. 385/390 and had about 500 monks. The sixth and seventh centuries were a period of prosperity for this monastery, which then hosted a community of women, under the patronage of Rachel. A fresco found at the monastery depicting Rachel dates to the sixth century. After the Islamic invasion, the monastery declined, and was abandoned around the tenth century.

Excavation
In early 1901, a survey of the site and surrounding areas was made by Jean Clédat, who was based at the French Institute of Oriental Archaeology in Cairo. Continuing into 1902, Clédat was assisted by Émile Gaston Chassinat and Charles Palanque. Clédat found hermitages he called "chapels" that contained Coptic art. His colleagues discovered two churches, today simply called North and South Church, with stone and wood carvings that were removed to the Coptic Museum in Cairo and the Musée du Louvre in Paris. Numerous sculptures and paintings were unearthed during the excavations. The papyrologist Jean Maspero (1885–1915)  resumed excavations in 1913, discovering a common room with several entrances.  In 1976, then 1984 and 1985, the Supreme Council of Antiquities resumed excavations and added to the collections of the Coptic Museum. Since then, excavations have continued under various organizations.

References

Further reading
Jean Clédat, 1901, "Notes archéologiques et philologiques", Bulletin de l'Institut Français d'Archéologie Orientale du Caire (BIFAO), no 1, p. 87-91
Jean Clédat, 1902, "Recherches sur le kôm de Baouît", Comptes Rendus de l'Academie des Inscriptions et Belles-Lettres (CRAIBL), no 30, p. 525-546
Jean Clédat, 1904, "Le monastère et la nécropole de Baouît", Mémoires de l'Institut Français d'Archéologie Orientale du Caire (MIFAO), no XII, 1 et 2
Jean Clédat, 1904, "Nouvelles recherches à Baouît (Haute-Égypte). Campagnes 1903-1904", CRAIBL, no 32, p. 517-527
Charles Palanque, 1906, "Rapport sur les recherches effectuées à Baouît en 1903", BIFAO, no 5, p. 1-21
Émile Chassinat, 1911, "Fouilles à Baouît", MIFAO, no XIII
Jean Maspero, 1913, "Rapport de M. Jean Maspero sur les fouilles entreprises à Bâouit", CRAIBL, p. 287-301
Jean Clédat, 1916, "Le monastère et la nécropole de Baouît", MIFAO, no XXXIX
Gustave Schlumberger, 1919, "Les fouilles de Jean Maspero à Baouît en 1913", CRAIBL, p. 243-248
Jean Maspero, 1931 and 1943, "Fouilles exécutées à Baouît, (notes mises en ordre et éditées par Étienne Drioton)", MIFAO, no LIX, 1 and 2
Marie-Hélène Rutschowscaya, 1995, "Le monastère de Baouît. État des publications", Divitiae Aegypti: Koptologische und verwandte Studien zu Ehren von Martin Krause, Wiesbaden, p. 279-288
Dominique Bénazeth and Marie-Hélène Rutschowscaya, 1999, "Jean Clédat, Le monastère et la nécropole de Baouît" MIFAO, no 111
Dominique Bénazeth and Thomasz Herbich, 2008, "Le kôm de Baouît: étapes d’une cartographie", BIFAO, no 108

Archaeological sites in Egypt
4th-century Christianity
1901 archaeological discoveries
4th-century religious buildings and structures
4th-century establishments